Bohuslav Fiala is a retired slalom canoeist who competed for Czechoslovakia in the late 1940s and the early 1950s. He won two medals at the ICF Canoe Slalom World Championships with a silver (C-2 team: 1951) and a bronze (Folding K-1 team: 1949).

References

Czechoslovak male canoeists
Possibly living people
Year of birth missing
Medalists at the ICF Canoe Slalom World Championships